Lionel Tromp (born 19 April 1984) is a football player and former member of the Aruba national football team. He has four caps for national team. He plays as striker.

References

External links
 

1984 births
Living people
Aruban footballers
Aruba international footballers
Association football forwards
SV Dakota players
SV La Fama players
People from Oranjestad, Aruba